Erick Bone (born 23 December 1988 in Manabi) is a welterweight Ecuadorian boxer who turned pro in 2011.

Professional boxing record

References

1988 births
Living people
People from Manabí Province
Ecuadorian male boxers
Welterweight boxers
21st-century Ecuadorian people